"So This Is Love?" is a rock song written by the group Van Halen for their 1981 album Fair Warning. It is one of four singles issued for the album, and is unique among Van Halen songs for being rooted in a swing beat. It peaked at number 110 on the U.S. Billboard Hot 100 and number 15 on the U.S. Mainstream Rock Tracks chart.

Record World said it has "a bit of the blues and lots of hard rock," performed with David Lee Roth's "vocal histrionics" and Eddie Van Halen's "sweaty lead guitar exposition."

Chuck Klosterman of Vulture.com ranked it the 29th-best Van Halen song, noting that it was "Anchored by an unpretentious bass line, 'So This Is Love?' is lyrically confusing, in that the verses of the song express romantic optimism while the title suggests romantic deflation."

A promotional music video was filmed for the song. The video aired on Happy Circus, a show on Italian state television station RAI 1 and was filmed at the Prehistoric Park in Rivolta d'Adda.

References

Van Halen songs
1981 songs
Song recordings produced by Ted Templeman
Songs written by Eddie Van Halen
Songs written by Alex Van Halen
Songs written by Michael Anthony (musician)
Songs written by David Lee Roth
Warner Records singles